Tüzmen is a Turkish surname. Notable people with the surname include:

 Kürşad Tüzmen (born 1958), Turkish Minister of State
 Tarkan Tüzmen (born 1968), Turkish singer and actor

Turkish-language surnames